Deborah Anne "Debbie" Georgiou (née Southwick, born 11 May 1976) is a retired British individual rhythmic gymnast. She won two bronze medals representing England at the 1994 Commonwealth Games and represented Great Britain at the 1992 Olympic Games.

Career 
Southwick was born in Liverpool and started competitive gymnastics at 11 years old, when she went from her local gymnastics club in St Helens to a North West regional squad training session. She was then invited to train in Bedford and was launched onto the British team. At 13 years old, she moved to Moscow after Irina Viner, whom for a short period took over the development of the U.K. National Rhythmic Gymnastics Team; saw potential in Southwick and wanted to work with her.

Southwick competed for Great Britain in the rhythmic gymnastics all-around competition at the 1992 Summer Olympics in Barcelona. She was placed 22nd in the qualification round and did not advance to the final. She retired from competitive sport at the age of 18.

Southwick is now a successful Jewellery designer. She has designed and hand make orders for built up celebrity clienteles including Amy Childs, Peter Andre, Katie Piper and Calum Best. She also lends her time as commentator in competitions for the International Federation of Gymnastics.

References

External links 
 

1976 births
Living people
British rhythmic gymnasts
Gymnasts at the 1992 Summer Olympics
Olympic gymnasts of Great Britain
Sportspeople from Liverpool
Commonwealth Games medallists in gymnastics
Commonwealth Games bronze medallists for England
Gymnasts at the 1994 Commonwealth Games
Medallists at the 1994 Commonwealth Games